Anderson de Jesus Santos (born 2 March 1995), simply known as Anderson, is a Brazilian footballer who plays as a central defender for Portuguese club F.C. Vizela.

Personal life
Anderson's older brother Valdo is also a footballer and a centre back. He was also groomed at Confiança.

References

External links

1995 births
Living people
Brazilian footballers
Association football midfielders
Campeonato Brasileiro Série A players
Campeonato Brasileiro Série B players
Campeonato Brasileiro Série C players
Campeonato Brasileiro Série D players
Associação Desportiva Confiança players
Guarani Esporte Clube (MG) players
Grêmio Foot-Ball Porto Alegrense players
Guarani FC players
Esporte Clube Bahia players
América Futebol Clube (MG) players
Primeira Liga players
F.C. Vizela players
Brazilian expatriate footballers
Brazilian expatriate sportspeople in Portugal
Expatriate footballers in Portugal
Sportspeople from Sergipe